My Brother Tom is a 1986 Australian television miniseries about sectarianism in a small country town.

References

External links
My Brother Tom at Crawfords Australia
My Brother Tom at IMDb

1980s Australian television miniseries
1986 Australian television series debuts
1986 Australian television series endings
English-language television shows